A Very She & Him Christmas is the first Christmas album and the third studio album by the folk/indie rock band She & Him, consisting of actress and musician Zooey Deschanel and musician M. Ward. The album was released on October 24, 2011, and features several covers of classic holiday songs. The twelve-track album is distributed by Merge Records and proceeds from every album sold are being donated to 826 National, a nonprofit network of writing and tutoring centers.

Their cover of "I'll Be Home for Christmas" was featured in the Christmas episode "The 23rd" of the TV-show New Girl, which stars Zooey Deschanel.

In 2012 it was awarded a silver certification from the Independent Music Companies Association which indicated sales of at least 20,000 copies throughout Europe and over 391,000 in the U.S.

Reception
At Metacritic, which assigns a normalized rating out of 100 to reviews from mainstream critics, the album received a score of 63, based on 16 critics, indicating "generally favorable" reviews.

PopMatters gave the album a score of 7/10, writing that it was "plain beautiful" and that it was "a calm, simple and easy to listen to recording to sit with and relax." A more mixed review from Pitchfork said that the songs were "just fine" but that She & Him "played this one too safe."

Track listing

Personnel
She & Him
 Zooey Deschanel – vocals, piano, ukulele
 M. Ward – vocals, guitar, organ

Additional personnel
 Jim Keltner – percussion
 Pierre de Reeder – engineer, percussion on "I'll Be Home for Christmas" and "Rockin' Around the Christmas Tree"
 Mike Post – assistant engineer

Charts

Weekly charts

Year-end charts

References

She & Him albums
2011 Christmas albums
Merge Records albums
Christmas albums by American artists
Covers albums
Pop Christmas albums
Albums recorded at Kingsize Soundlabs